The 1950 NCAA Swimming and Diving Championships were contested in March 1950 at the Ohio State Natatorium at the Ohio State University in Columbus, Ohio at the 14th annual NCAA-sanctioned swim meet to determine the team and individual national champions of men's collegiate swimming and diving in the United States. 

Hosts Ohio State repeated as team champions, capturing their sixth overall title and fifth title in six years.

Program changes
 Two new events were added to the NCAA championship program: the 100-yard backstroke and the 100-yard butterfly.

Team standings
Note: Top 10 only
(H) = Hosts
Full results

See also
List of college swimming and diving teams

References

NCAA Division I Men's Swimming and Diving Championships
NCAA Swimming And Diving Championships
NCAA Swimming And Diving Championships
NCAA Swimming And Diving Championships